Pterinochilus murinus or the orange baboon tarantula, is an old-world tarantula that was first described in 1897 by Reginald Innes Pocock.  This species is found on the African continent, in Angola, as well as central, eastern, and southern Africa. It is a member of the subfamily Harpactirinae, baboon spiders.

Among those who keep tarantulas as pets, Pterinochilus murinus is known as "OBT", acronym which stands for "orange baboon tarantula" or "orange bitey thing", and also as the "pterror", a pun on its Latin genus classification of Pterinochilus. These nicknames reference a particular orange colour form that is prized in the hobby for its beauty, as well as its painful bite. It is also known as the Mombasa golden starburst tarantula.

This species is incredibly defensive and, as with most old world tarantulas, should not be held. The bite of this species, while not serious, is extremely painful. Moreover, the species is more than willing to inflict such a bite without first presenting the typical threat display. Caution when dealing with this species is strongly advised.

Description
Female P. murinus can grow to 4–6 inches (10-15cm) in size (measured from the tip of the front left leg, to the tip of the rear right leg), while males typically range from 3–4 inches (7.5-10cm). The spider's abdomen, carapace, and legs have the same basic coloration, though the legs typically have brightly colored rings. The carapace has a star-shaped pattern, with a fishbone pattern present on the abdomen. The eyes are clustered together on a raised part of the carapace (in common with all tarantulas). The body is covered with short hairs, with longer hair present on the legs. Urticating hairs are not present.

There are currently 5 known colour variants of Pterinochilus murinus: and also localities of those as listed after the color form names.

 BCF - Brown Colour Form - Tete, Mozambique
 DCF - Dark Colour Form - Botswana/Zimbabwe, Kenya, Kigoma, Mikumi
 OCF - Orange Colour Form - Usambara Mountains Region (used to be called UMW before RCF was found)
 RCF - Red Colour Form - Usambara Mountains Region
 TCF - Typical Colour Form - Kenya, Mozambique

These colour variants are found in different geographical locations, and the colouration is thought to be related to the type of soil present where each variant lives.

Distribution
Pternochilus murinus is found in different parts of Africa and has also been recorded on the island of Zanzibar.

Behavior

The orange baboon tarantula is very defensive, and will bite immediately if provoked. Consequently, it is not recommended that hobbyists keep this species without extensive prior experience handling venomous spiders.

The female excavates a burrow, or colonizes an existing burrow that has been abandoned.

As pets
These spiders are not common in pet stores but are very popular in the pet trade. These spiders build a tunnel shaped web and as adults should be provided around 40-80 cm of substrate. They are commonly fed crickets, cockroaches, and grasshoppers. Though they can kill small vertebrates (mice, small lizards, birds, snakes), these feeder animals are not commonly used in captive care. 

These spiders can be very defensive and have very painful bites. Although their venom is not known to be lethal to humans, it is considered medically significant and thus it is advised to avoid handling this species.

References

Theraphosidae
Spiders of Africa
Spiders described in 1897